Henry Jackson Hunt (frequently called "Henry I. Hunt") was a politician and businessman from Detroit, Michigan.

Henry Jackson Hunt was born in Watertown, New York in 1786, the first son of American Revolutionary War colonel Thomas Hunt.  He arrived in Detroit around 1800 and went into the mercantile and real estate business, in some cases in partnership with Lewis Cass.  In 1811, he married Ann MacIntosh, daughter of Angus MacIntosh, a well-to-do fur trader and "Earl of Moy."  The couple had no children, but Hunt's brother Samuel named his son after Henry.  The younger Henry Jackson Hunt went on to become a brigadier general in the American Civil War.

The elder Henry Jackson Hunt held various political offices in the city, including Colonel of the militia (1800- 1815), County Court Judge (1815), City Assessor (1817), Trustee of the University of Michigan (1821), and in 1826 Mayor of Detroit.  Hunt died while in office, on September 15, 1826.

References

1798 births
1826 deaths
Mayors of Detroit
Regents of the University of Michigan
19th-century American judges
19th-century American politicians